Saturday Live is a BBC Radio 4 magazine programme which combines real-life stories with short features and contributions from studio guests, as well as the musical segment known as "Inheritance Tracks", in which famous people share information about the music that they would recommend to future generations, and the music that they would say that they, themselves, inherited from a previous generation. Since 2013, following the example of a particular listener experience that resonated with the audience, it has featured a segment called "Thank You". This consists of voice messages from listeners who received acts of kindness from those strangers who were not, or could not be, thanked properly at the time. These messages sometimes refer to accidents, or amusing incidents, that happened decades earlier, and occasionally the kind stranger is found, and their response is then also shared.

Currently presented by Richard Coles, formerly together with Aasmah Mir and also previously with JP Devlin, Saturday Live is broadcast live between 9.00 and 10.30 on Saturday mornings (UK time) and is available world-wide on demand in the form of an extensive on-line archive that includes streaming, download, and podcast formats. In 2015, John Patrick (JP) Devlin stated on-air, as the only remaining member of the presentation team from first programme, nine years earlier, that he had "...seen out two Radio 4 Controllers, four Director Generals and, get this, eighteen Saturday Live presenters...". According to presenter, Richard Coles, at the end of 2014 there were more than 1.8 million weekly listeners  and according to Poppy North of C. Hurst & Co. on April 30, 2019 there were 2.4 million listeners.

In May 2008 the programme, then presented by Fi Glover, was named Best UK Speech Programme at the annual Sony Radio Academy Awards. In February 2011, however, it was highlighted by the journalist and newscaster Alastair Stewart as "unfunny, self-indulgent, contrived and, worst of all, twee" and therefore unworthy, in his opinion, of a slot in the Radio 4 schedule. In May 2012, the duration of Saturday Live was increased to its current length of 90 minutes by being extended into the time-slot formerly occupied by the travel programme Excess Baggage.

The programme's original introductory theme music was taken from various instrumental sections of Steady, As She Goes by the Raconteurs.

JP Devlin has not appeared on the programme since 2019. He has more recently appeared on Loose Ends and the Fortunately podcast.

Aasmah Mir announced on air during the show of 25 April 2020 that it was her last appearance on the show. She left to join the new Times Radio station as a breakfast presenter.

In December 2020, it was announced that Richard Coles' new co-host would be the broadcaster Nikki Bedi.

References

External links
 BBC Radio 4 - Saturday Live

BBC Radio 4 programmes
British talk radio programmes